The Nederlander Organization, founded in 1912 by David T. Nederlander in Detroit, and currently based in New York City, is one of the largest operators of live theaters and music venues in the United States. Its first acquisition was a lease on the Detroit Opera House in 1912. The building was demolished in 1928. It later operated the Shubert Lafayette Theatre  until its demolition in 1964 and the Riviera Theatre, both in Detroit. Since then, the organization has grown to include nine Broadway theaters – making it the second-largest owner of Broadway theaters after the Shubert Organization – and a number of theaters across the United States, including five large theaters in Chicago, plus three West End theatres in London.

Current venues

Broadway theatres

 Gershwin Theatre
 Lena Horne Theatre
 Lunt-Fontanne Theatre
 Marquis Theatre
 Minskoff Theatre
 Nederlander Theatre
 Palace Theatre
 Richard Rodgers Theatre
 Neil Simon Theatre

West End theatres

 Adelphi Theatre (co-owned with Andrew Lloyd Webber's LW Theatres)
 Aldwych Theatre
 Dominion Theatre

Chicago theatres
Auditorium Theatre (booking rights; owned by Roosevelt University)
Broadway Playhouse at Water Tower Place
Cadillac Palace Theatre
CIBC Theatre
Nederlander Theatre

Other US venues

Centennial Hall – under contract with the University of Arizona, Tucson
The Grove of Anaheim – Anaheim, California
Pantages Theatre – Los Angeles 
Balboa Theatre – San Diego 
Civic Theatre – San Diego
San Jose Center for the Performing Arts – San Jose, California
San Jose Civic Auditorium – San Jose, California
Santa Barbara Bowl – Santa Barbara, California
Durham Performing Arts Center – Durham, North Carolina
Steven Tanger Center for the Performing Arts – Greensboro, North Carolina
North Charleston Performing Arts Center – North Charleston, South Carolina
Heritage Bank Center – Cincinnati, Ohio and its tenant, the Cincinnati Cyclones Professional Hockey Team 
National Theatre – Washington, DC under contract with The National Theatre
West Harbor Amphitheater Los Angeles- under development as of 2023.

Former venues

Former Broadway theatres
Biltmore Theatre (sold)
Henry Miller's Theatre (sold)
Mark Hellinger Theatre (sold)
New Amsterdam Theatre (sold)

Other former venues
Alpine Valley Music Theatre –  East Troy, Wisconsin (sold)
Arie Crown Theater – Chicago (1977–1986; contract ended)
Arrowhead Pond – Anaheim, California 1994–2004(management contract ended)
Birmingham Theatre – Birmingham, Michigan (sold and reverted to cinema)
Bogart's – Cincinnati (sold)
Concord Pavilion – Concord, California (management contract ended)
Curran Theatre – San Francisco (now operated by Carole Shorenstein Hays)
Detroit Opera House – Detroit; owned and operated by Michigan Opera Theatre (interest sold in April 2021)
Fisher Theatre – Detroit (sold in April 2021)
Fox Tucson Theatre – Tucson, Arizona (changed venues)
Fox Theatre – San Diego (management contract ended)
Golden Gate Theatre – San Francisco (sold in April 2021) 
Greek Theatre – Los Angeles (contract ended in 2015)
Masonic Theatre – Detroit (management contract ended)
McVickers Theatre – Chicago
Merriweather Post Pavilion – Columbia, Maryland (sold)
Morris A. Mechanic Theatre – Baltimore (closed)
National Theatre – Washington, D.C. (1970–1982)
New World Music Theater – Tinley Park, Illinois (sold)
Orpheum Theatre – San Francisco (sold in April 2021) 
Pacific Amphitheatre – Costa Mesa, California (management contract sold)
Palace West – Phoenix 
Pine Knob Music Theatre – Clarkston, Michigan (sold in 1990)
Poplar Creek Music Theater – Hoffman Estates, Illinois (sold and demolished 1994-1995)
Riverbend Music Center – Cincinnati (booking only, 1984–1999; sold) 
Fox Performing Arts Center – Riverside, California (contract ended) 
Grand Riviera Theater – Detroit (closed 1974; demolished 1999)
Shubert Lafayette Theatre – Detroit (demolished 1964)
Studebaker Theatre – Chicago
Target Center – Minneapolis (co-managed 2004–2007)
Taft Theatre – Cincinnati (sold)
Tucson Music Hall – Tucson (management contract ended)
Wang Theatre – Boston (1982–1984; contract ended)
Wilshire Theatre – Beverly Hills, California (1981–1989; contract ended).

Subscription series
Best of Broadway (North Charleston)
Broadway In Chicago
Broadway In Detroit 
Broadway Los Angeles (formerly Los Angeles Civic Light Opera)
Broadway San Diego (formerly San Diego Playgoers)
Broadway in Tucson
Truist Broadway (Durham, North Carolina)

Legal actions
In 1993, the Orange County Fair Board purchased the remaining 30 years of Nederlander's 40-year lease on the Pacific Amphitheatre for $12.5 million.  The board filed suit against Nederlander in 1995 maintaining that the organization placed restrictive sound covenants in the sale contract that made the venue unusable and therefore eliminated it from competing with the nearby Greek Theatre and Arrowhead Pond.

In January 2014, Nederlander settled a suit with the U.S. Attorney's Office in New York City over violations of the Americans with Disabilities Act.  Under the consent decree, Nederlander agreed to make alterations within three-years to nine of its theatres in New York to make them more accessible and pay a $45,000 penalty.  The case was one in a series filed by the U.S. Attorney against a number of public venues in the city.

Gallery

See also
 SHN (theatres)

References

External links

 
 Nederlander Worldwide Website

Broadway theatre
Theatre in New York City
Theatre-owning companies
 
American theatre managers and producers
Companies based in Detroit
Entertainment companies established in 1912
1912 establishments in Michigan
Theatre in Detroit
Nederlander family

West End theatres
Theatre in London